The Catholic Church in Eswatini is part of the worldwide Catholic Church, under the spiritual leadership of the Pope in Rome.

There are approximately 60,000 Catholics in Eswatini – around 5% of the total population. The country forms a single diocese – the Diocese of Manzini.

The Catholic Church began in Eswatini in 1913 with the arrival of Servite missionaries who began work in Mbabane. Two of Eswatini's bishops were born in Eswatini: MandleNkhosi Zwane and Ncamiso Ndlovu.

References

 
Eswatini
Eswatini